CAST-31, Technical Clarifications Identified for RTCA DO-254 / EUROCAE ED-80 is a Certification Authorities Software Team (CAST) Position Paper. It is an FAA publication that "does not constitute official policy or guidance from any of the authorities", but is provided for educational and informational purposes only for applicants for software and hardware certification.

Contents  
DO-254/ED-80 was introduced in 2000, but, unlike DO-178C, has not been updated to address concerns coming from decades of experience with applying the guidance of the standard; including errors, omissions, and advances in technology. This CAST Position Paper was created as both needed interim clarifications and a starting point for eventual development and release of an updated DO-254/ED-80.

Concerns identified in the Position Paper include:
 a few known errors in the standard, largely concerning consistency within the document (definition of complex) and across related processes (usage of IDAL),
 a compilation of recognized omissions to be added (notably, increased resolution in addressing hardware of ranging complexity, from extremely simple to highly complex) with identification of published sources for information on the omitted topics,
 updates to the revision status of referenced publications that have been modified since the standard’s release, particularly ARP 4754A/ED79A and DO-178C, and
 various additional content clarifications.

Where this Position Paper identifies an omission or need for clarification in DO-254, it generally identifies a section within either FAA Order 8110.105 or EASA CM-SWCEH-001 where the issue is discussed.

While DO-254/ED-80 has not been updated, this Position Paper is no longer provided on the FAA website because the "model for certification authority harmonization has changed since CAST's inception and now includes direct collaboration with industry on technical topics."

References

External links  
 . Retrieved 2021-11-02.

Avionics
Safety
Software requirements
RTCA standards
Computer standards